Perlmutter is a German and Ashkenazi Jewish surname. It may refer to:

  (1845–1941), Austrian photographer
 Alvin H. Perlmutter, television producer
 David Perlmutter, American physician and author
 David M. Perlmutter, American linguist
 Ed Perlmutter, US Congressman from Colorado
 Inbal Perlmutter, Israeli musician
 Isaac Perlmutter, American businessman and financier
 Jordon Perlmutter (1931–2011), American real estate developer
 Richard Perlmutter, songwriter, singer and producer
 Roger Perlmutter, Merck research leader and scientist
 Saul Perlmutter, Nobel laureate astrophysicist at Lawrence Berkeley National Laboratory

German-language surnames
Jewish surnames
Yiddish-language surnames